You've Got to Share: Songs for Children is an album by American singer-songwriter Don McLean, released in 2003.

Track listing 
Little Rooster
Be Kind to your Parents
You've got to Share
This Old Man
Windy Old Weather
I'm an Old Cowhand
The Eagle
You have no right (solo Jackie McLean)
Luby Lu
The Cat came Back
The Horse Named Bill
Pick it up
Hush Little Baby
Blackberry Blossom
Birdies Three  (A la Volette)
Where Have All the Flowers Gone?
Going to the Chapel/Goodnight Sweetheart

Notes
"Be Kind to your Parents" composed by Harold Rome
"I'm an Old Cowhand" composed by Johnny Mercer
"Pick it up" composed by Woody Guthrie
"Birdies Three  (A la Volette)" composed by A. Kevess
"Where Have All The Flowers Gone" composed by Pete Seeger
"Going to the Chapel/Goodnight Sweetheart" composed by Barry, Carter, Greenwich, Hudson and Spector

Don McLean albums
2003 albums